The Institute of Plant Physiology and Genetics of the National Academy of Sciences of Ukraine (IPPG) is a leading scientific research organisation in the Ukrainian city of Kyiv. Founded in 1946 as a branch of the Institute of Botany, the Institute specialises in crop breeding, plant physiology, genetics and cellular engineering.

Current status
On 2007, the Institute has 7 departments, 3 regional science centers with about 1,000 employees.

Main scientific fields
Scientific research of the Institute are executed after perspective directions, NAN of Ukraine ratified Presidium
finding out of physical, chemical, molecular conformities that law the growth, development and firmness of the vegetable systems, creation on this basis of new technologies, and biotechnology;
comprehensive study of processes of photosynthesis, mineral feed of plants, biological azotfiksacii, possibilities of the use biologically of active matters, ground of new intensive technologies of growing and storage of agricultural produce;
study of mechanisms of genetic processes with the purpose of development of principles of management of living organisms the inherited changeability, development of genetic and physiology bases of selection of plants.

Scientific schools
The institute comprises scientific schools in the following disciplines:
molecular genetics (founder is an academician of NAN, Ukraine, Serhij Mykhajlo Gershenzon);
experimental plant mutagenetics (founder is an academician of NAN, Ukraine, Volodymyr Vasyl Morgun);
physiology of plant growth and development (founder is Ukrainian Honoured Scientist F.L. Kalinin);
physiological role of trace elements (founder is an academician of AN, Ukraine, Vasgnil p.A. Vlasyuk);
physiology and ecology of photosynthesis (founder is Ukrainian Honoured Scientist A.S. Okanenko).

Achievement and developments
For a general revision and introduction sorts and hybrids of winter wheat, rye are offered, tritikale, corn of selection of institute, new high-efficiency competitive cultures of bul'bochkovikh bacteria.

Management 
 Director: Volodymyr V. Morgun, DSc (Biol)

External links 
 Official website of the Institute
 National Academy of Sciences of Ukraine - Instituteof Plant Physiology and Genetics - Dr. Volodymyr Morgun

Research institutes in Ukraine
Genetics or genomics research institutions
Organizations based in Kyiv
Research institutes in the Soviet Union